Sugar and Spice is the second studio album by the British rock band The Searchers released in 1963. This album features the band's second big hit single "Sugar and Spice". With two successful Top 5 albums in three months, and two other Top 3 hit singles at the time, the group proved to be the strongest to emerge from Liverpool next to the Beatles and Gerry and the Pacemakers. They solidified their position further with another album track, "Ain't That Just Like Me", which was later released in the US and hit #61 on the Billboard Hot 100.

Overview and recording
The first album single, "Sugar and Spice", was written by producer Tony Hatch (using the pseudonym Fred Nightingale in order to better convince the band to record it), and he felt the song had enormous hit potential for its similarity to previous No.1 hit "Sweets for My Sweet". Both songs are similar in style, backing vocals, chord progressions, and guitar solos. Hatch plotted for it to be the next Searchers A-side. They recorded the song, despite their dislike and initial opposition to it. Chris Curtis disliked the similarities to "Sweets for my Sweet" and refused to sing on it (although he did overdub the high-pitched harmony links between verses). Nevertheless, it reached No. 2 on the UK's Record Retailer chart, just one step behind the Beatles' "I Want to Hold Your Hand". With the massive popularity of the Searchers, Pye Records decided to release a follow-up album as soon as possible for the Christmas market. The group were pulled back to the studio in the middle of their UK tour with Brian Poole and the Tremeloes and Roy Orbison and made the new album in just three days. In similarity to their debut album it contained more numbers from their original stage repertoire. They covered tunes by their American idols, such as Buddy Holly ("Listen to Me", "Don't Cha Know"), girl group The Chiffons ("Oh My Lover"), and The Coasters ("Ain't That Just Like Me"), and also the sort of Merseybeat standard "Some Other Guy", which became a staple ingredient in almost every Liverpool group's set-list.

Release
Sugar and Spice was released as a mono LP album on the Pye label in the UK in Autumn 1963, Pye NPL 18089. It entered the LP charts on 16 November 1963 and went to No. 5 (the band's first LP Meet the Searchers still occupied No. 3 that same week) and stayed for 21 weeks. Four of the album's tracks were later issued on the EP Hungry for Love, which went to No. 4 in the UK charts. Sugar And Spice LP was not available in the US. Instead, five of the album's twelve tracks appeared on Kapp Records' release, Meet The Searchers / Needles and Pins, issued in North America only (and with two more on another US-only LP, This Is Us).

Track listing

Personnel
The Searchers
 Tony Jackson - bass, lead vocals, backing vocals
 Mike Pender - lead guitar, backing vocals, lead vocals 
 John McNally - rhythm guitar, backing vocals
 Chris Curtis - drums, backing vocals, lead vocals
Additional musicians and production
 Tony Hatch – producer, piano
 Ray Prickett – recording engineer

References

1963 albums
The Searchers (band) albums
Pye Records albums